Phantom Jack is the eponymous character of a comic book series created by writer Michael San Giacomo. Its publication started in early 2004 as a monthly series at Image Comics, completing its first five-issues story-arc. After a creative team change and a creative difference with the publisher, the title moved to Speakeasy Comics where its first arc was collected in 2005 as a trade paperback.

Synopsis

Newspaper reporter Jack Baxter can turn invisible. Not exactly a hero, Baxter uses his powers to scoop other reporters. His test of fire comes when his brother is captured in Iraq. Jack rescues his brother with the aid of the beautiful Madison Blue, an invisible secret agent for the group 'Miscellaneous'. Stories lean toward realistic portrayals of characters in modern world, not typical super-hero fare. The series ran in 2005 from Image and returned in November, 2007, from Atomic Pop Art Entertainment with ABSOLUTE PHANTOM JACK, which collects all the previous Image comics and about 80 pages of new stories. The all-new, 110-page graphic novel PHANTOM JACK: THE NOWHERE MAN AGENDA, where Jack confronts his evil opposite and faces his final fate, will be published as soon as a new publisher is found.

The sequel: PHANTOM JACK: THE NOWHERE MAN AGENDA, the all-new, 110-page collection of five stories, was released Aug. 18, 2010 from IDW.

Bibliography

 2003: Created by Michael San Giacomo as part of Marvel Comics' aborted revival of their "Epic" imprint.
 2004: Phantom Jack #1 - #5 is a monthly series at Image Comics. Art by Mitchell Breitweiser, colors by Jaime Jones.
 2005: Phantom Jack: The Collected Edition (Speakeasy Comics) collects the first series and adds six new stories with new artwork from Sean McArdle and Brett Barkley.
 2007, January: "Phantom Jack: The Absolute Edition" collecting all the stories in the trade paperback along with two new stories for Atomic Pop Art Entertainment.
 2009, August: Visionary Comics began releasing the complete run of Phantom Jack through various digital venues. These versions are in standard comic page lengths, but include the short stories from the Absolute Edition TPB and will run seven issues. They are available for PDF and mobile comic applications.
 2010, Aug. 18: The release of the all-new 110-page graphic novel from IDW, PHANTOM JACK: THE NOWHERE MAN AGENDA featuring a battle to the death between Jack and his evil, invisible counterpart, THE NOWHERE MAN.
Art by Sean McArdle, Andy Belanger and Andy Finlayson. Inks by Tom Schloendorn, colors and cover by Nathaniel Fairbairn.

External links
 Phantom Jack releases page at Speakeasy
 Phantom Jack Digital Editions at Visionary Comics

Image Comics titles